Henry Clutton (19 March 1819 – 27 June 1893) was an English architect and designer.

Life

Henry Clutton was born on 19 March 1819, the son of Owen and Elizabeth Goodinge Clutton. He studied with Edward Blore between 1835 and 1840, but began his own practice in 1844. He became an expert in French medieval architecture. Clutton also worked with William Burges. John Francis Bentley was a student of Clutton.

In 1855, Clutton and Burges won the competition to design Lille Cathedral; however, the idea of entrusting the construction of a church in honour of the Virgin to foreign architects of an Anglican confession raised objections. Therefore, the project was given to a local architect.

Between 1858 and 1860, Clutton built Minley Manor in the French chateau style for Raikes Currie, a partner in Glyn Mills' Bank and a member of the Currie family who benefited substantially from slavery in the British West Indies. It was later used by the Royal School of Military Engineering.

After Cliveden House burned down for the second time, around 1859, George Sutherland-Leveson-Gower, 2nd Duke of Sutherland commissioned Clutton to design a nearby water tower. The 100-foot (30m) clock tower was added in 1861 and still provides water for the house today. It is rendered in Roman cement like the rest of the house, and features four clock faces framed by gilded surrounds and a half-open staircase on its north side. It was described by the architectural critic Nicholas Pevsner as "the epitome of Victorian flamboyance and assertiveness."

He is buried at St Mary Magdalen, Mortlake.

Works
 Illustrations of Medieval Architecture in France, from the Accession of Charles VI. to the Demise of Louis XII: With Historical and Professional Remarks

Buildings
 Battle Abbey, Sussex
 Grosvenor House, remodelling, 1870–72 and 1880–81
 Hatherop Castle, Gloucestershire
Hoar Cross Hall, Staffordshire, 1862–71
 Houghton Hall, Houghton Regis, Bedfordshire, c. 1851: overhaul of the mansion
The Mansion House, Old Warden Park, Bedfordshire, 1896
 Merevale Hall, Atherstone, Warwickshire
 Moorhouse Chantry Chapel, Nottinghamshire, 1860
 Moorhouse, Chapel of St Nicholas, Nottinghamshire
 Mount St Mary's College, Derbyshire, 1876
 Quantock Lodge, Somerset
 St Francis of Assisi Church, Notting Hill, London
 St. Mary of the Isle Church, Douglas, Isle of Man, 1859
 Romanesque cloister at the Birmingham Oratory, 1860
 Ruthin Castle, Ruthin, Wales
 St Luke's Church, Simonsbath, Exmoor, Somerset
 St Mary of the Angels, Worthing, West Sussex, 1864
 Sacred Heart Church, Bournemouth
 St Michael's Church, Ditton, Cheshire
 St Michael the Archangel Church, Chatham, Kent
 St Mary's Church, Ewell, Surrey
St Mary's Church, Steeple Ashton, Wiltshire, 1853: rebuilding of chancel
 St. Philip's School, Birmingham
 The Sandy Lodge, Bedfordshire
Welcombe Hotel, Stratford upon Avon, Warwickshire
 Widmerpool Hall, Nottinghamshire
Wrotham Park, Hertfordshire
 St Mary's Church, Woburn, Bedfordshire 1865–1868
 St Peter's Church, Leamington Spa, Warwickshire

Gallery

References

1819 births
1893 deaths
19th-century British architects
Bedford Estate
Burials at St Mary Magdalen Roman Catholic Church Mortlake